Kishore Nandlaskar (1940 – 20 April 2021) was an Indian actor, who is noted for his work in Hindi and Marathi cinema. He was a known personality in the Marathi film industry, who mostly played comic characters. Nandlaskar made his debut as an actor in the Marathi cinema with the 1989's film In'ina Dika. He is known for his work in films like Khakee (2004), Vaastav: The Reality (1999), Singham (2011), Simba, Miss U Miss, Gaon Thor Pudhari Chor and Are Soda Batali Bai.

He died of COVID-19 on 20 April 2021.

Early life and career 
Nandlaskar's native village is Shejawali in Kharepatan taluka, Maharashtra. He was born in Mumbai, India. He spent his childhood in Lamington Road, Nagpada, Ghatkopar and some other places in Mumbai. He attended New Era High School and Union High School.

He performed plays like Vitthal Farari, Natheetun Marla Teer, Sundara Manamdhe Bharli by folk drama writer Sharad Niphadkar. Around the same time, in 1980, he participated in Doordarshan's Gajra, Natak and other programs.

Nandlaskar had acted in about 40 plays, more than 25 Marathi and Hindi films and more than 20 series. ‘Nana Karte Pyaar’ was his last play in commercial theater. Sare Sajjan, Shejari Shejari, Halad Rusli Kunku Hasle and a few other films are credited to his name. On the commercial stage, Nandlaskar made the audience laugh with his plays like Chal Atap Jalve, Bhramacha Bhopala, Pahuna, Shriman Shrimati, Bhole Dambis and One Room Kitchen.

Filmography 

 2020 - Miss U Miss
 2019 - Stepney (2019 film) 
 2019 - Perfume
 2019 - Dhadpad
 2018 - Pakda Pakdi
 2018 - Simmba
 2017 - Bhavishyachi Aishi Taishi: The Prediction
 2017 - Gaon Thor Pudhari Chor
 2014 - Madhyamvarg: The Middle Class
 2014 - Are Soda Batali Bai
 2013 - Mandali Tumchyasathi Kay Pan
 2013 - Tatya Vinchu Lage Raho
 2013 - Kutha Bolu Naka
 2012 - Yedyanchi Jatra
 2011 - Aajoba Vayat Aale
 2011 - Shabri
 2011 - Ashi Fasli Nanachi Tang
 2011 - Singham
 2011 - Swargacha Visa
 2010 - Most Wanted (2010 film)
 2010 - Dus Tola
 2010 - Tum Milo Toh Sahi
 2010 -  Kurukshetra
 2010 - Kalshekar Aahet Ka?
 2010 - Ek Shodh
 2010 - Gosht Lagna Nantarchi
 2009 - Lonavala Bypass
 2009 - Sanam Hum Aapke Hain...
 2009 - Nasheebachi Aishi Taishi
 2009 - Fruit and Nut
 2009 - Love Kaa Taddka
 2009 - Hello! Gandhe Sir
 2008 - Dasvidaniya
 2007 - Mumbaiche Shahne
 2007 - Soon Majhi Bhagyachi
 2007 - Dumkata
 2006 - Ishhya
 2006 - Lalbaugcha Raja
 2006 - London Cha Jawai
 2005 - Thaiman
 2005 - Munnabhai S.S.C
 2005 - Chakachak
 2005 - Chalta Hai Yaar
 2004 - Khakee
 2003 - Baap Ka Baap
 2003 - Pran Jaaye Par Shaan Na Jaaye
 2002 - Aadharstambh
 2002 - Be-Lagaam
 2002 -  Hathyar
 2001 - Ehsaas: The Feeling
2001 - Yeh Teraa Ghar Yeh Meraa Ghar
 2000 - Jis Desh Mein Ganga Rehta Hain 
 2000 - Astitva
 1999 - Dhandgad Dhinga
 1999 - Rang Premacha
 1999 - Vaastav: The Reality
 1998 - Paij Lagnachi
 1997 -  Yeshwant
 1997 - Tyag
 1997 - Purna Satya
 1995 - Jamla Ho Jamla
 1994 - Akka
 1994 - Bajrangachi Kamaal
 1994 - Vishwavinayak
 1993 - Lapandav
 1993 - Garam Masala
 1993 - Sarech Sajjan
 1993 - Wajva Re Wajva
 1993 - Bedardi
 1993 - Karamati Coat
 1992 - Gruhpravesh
 1991 - Doctor Doctor
 1991 - Shame to Shame
 1991 - Yeda Ki Khula
 1991 - Halad Rusli Kunku Hasla
 1991 - Shejari Shejari
 1990 - Dhamal Bablya Ganpyachi
 1990 - Kuthe Kuthe Shodu Mi Tila
 1989 - Chambu Gabale
 1989 - Dharla Tar Chavtay
 1989 - Hamaal De Dhamaal
 1989 - Ina Mina Dika
 1989 -Thartharat
 1989 - Pasant Ahe Mulgi Sahebrao
 1982 - Navare Sagle Gadhav

Television 
 2019 - Koparkhali 
 2019 - Zhale Mokale Aakash 
 1999 - Stars Bestsellers: Anand''' 
 1990 - Bhikaji Rao Karodpati 
 1990 - Nasti Aafat''

Death 
Nandlaskar died of COVID-19 on 20 April 2021, in Thane, Maharashtra.

See also 

 List of Marathi film actors
 List of Hindi film actors

References

External links

Indian male film actors
Indian male television actors
Male actors in Hindi cinema
Male actors in Marathi cinema
20th-century Indian male actors
Male actors from Mumbai
21st-century Indian male actors
Male actors in Marathi television
Deaths from the COVID-19 pandemic in India
2021 deaths
1940 births